Bastar Vishwavidyalaya (BVV) or Bastar University, is a State university located in Jagdalpur, Chhattisgarh, India. It is a teaching-cum-affiliating university which affiliates 30 college and has 10 University Teaching Departments (UTD). It was established and incorporated by Chhattisgarh Vishwavidyalaya Adhiniyam No. 18 of 2008 on September 2, 2008.

Affiliated colleges
Its jurisdiction extends over 7 districts -Bastar, Bijapur, Dantewada, Kanker, Kondagaon, Narayanpur, Sukma .

Departments
The university has eleven teaching departments:
 School of Management Studies (SMS)
 School of Studies in Anthropology
 School of Studies in Biotechnology
 School of Studies in Computer Application
 School of Studies in Education
 School of Studies in English
 School of Studies in Forestry & Wildlife
 School of Studies in Physical Education
 School of Studies in Political Science
 School of Studies in Rural Technology
 School of Studies in Social Work

References

External links

Educational institutions established in 2008
2008 establishments in Chhattisgarh
Universities in Chhattisgarh
Bastar district